Alfred Hubert Evans (September 28, 1916 – April 6, 1979) was an American Major League Baseball catcher and a Minor League manager. He was born in Kenly, North Carolina.

Basically a contact, line-drive hitter, Evans was a fine reserve catcher with a strong throwing arm. As many bigleaguers, he saw his baseball career interrupted while serving in the US Navy during World War II.

He was released from the Navy in time for the end of the 1944 season with the Senators, staying with the club until 1950. His most productive season came in 1949, when he posted career-highs in games (109), batting average (.271), RBI (42), runs (32), and doubles.

In a 12-season career, Evans was a .250 hitter (514-for-2053) with 13 home runs and 211 RBI in 704 games, including 188 runs, 70 doubles, 23 triples, 14 stolen bases, and a .332 on-base percentage. In 647 catching appearances, he recorded 2295 outs, 284 assists, 51 double plays, and committed 56 errors in 2635 chances for a .979 fielding percentage.

Following his playing retirement, Evans managed for the New York Yankees (1955), Kansas City Athletics (1955–1959) and Minnesota Twins (1963–1965) minor league systems. He also scouted for the Senators and their post-1960 identity, Twins, as well as the San Francisco Giants.

Evans died in Wilson, North Carolina, at age 62.

See also

Boston Red Sox all-time roster
May 3, 1949 in baseball

References

Al Evans - Baseballbiography.com
Baseball Reference
Retrosheet
Baseball in Wartime

1916 births
1979 deaths
Baseball players from North Carolina
Boston Red Sox players
Charlotte Hornets (baseball) players
Los Angeles Angels (minor league) players
Louisville Colonels (minor league) players
Major League Baseball catchers
Minnesota Twins scouts
Minor league baseball managers
New Bern Bears players
Norfolk Tars players
People from Kenly, North Carolina
San Francisco Giants scouts
United States Navy personnel of World War II
Washington Senators (1901–1960) players
Washington Senators (1901–60) scouts